The Siegel–Schwall Band is an album by the blues-rock group the Siegel–Schwall Band.  Released in 1971, it was their fifth album, and their first to be released by Wooden Nickel Records.  It is not to be confused with the band's 1966 debut album, which is also titled The Siegel-Schwall Band.

The Siegel–Schwall Band won the 1973 Grammy Award for Best Album Cover. The cover was illustrated by Harvey Dinnerstein, with art direction by Acy R. Lehman.

Track listing
Side one:
"(Wish I Was on a) Country Road" (Jim Post, Corky Siegel) – 3:19 
"Devil" (Siegel) – 5:10 
"Leavin'" (Jim Schwall) – 3:10 
"Corrina" (Traditional) – 6:05 
Side two:
"I Won't Hold My Breath" (Siegel) – 4:01 
"Next to You" (Schwall) – 4:20 
"Hush Hush" (Jimmy Reed) – 11:06

Personnel

Siegel-Schwall Band
Corky Siegel – piano, harmonica, vocals
Jim Schwall – guitar, vocals
Rollo Radford – bass, vocals
Shelly Plotkin – drums

Production
Produced by Bill Traut and Peter Szillies
Engineers: John Janus, Roger Anfinsen, Joe Lopes, Gary Taylor, Randy Kling
Mixing: Martin Feldman
Photography: Colin Johnson
Artwork: Harvey Dinnerstein
Art direction: Acy Lehman

References

Siegel–Schwall Band albums
1971 albums